The Prairie Mystery is a 1922 American silent Western film directed by George Edwardes-Hall and starring Bud Osborne, Pauline Curley and Pearlie Norton. Given an initial premiere in 1922, it was re-distributed the following year by the recently established Truart Film Corporation.

Cast
 Bud Osborne as Jim Holmes
 Pauline Curley
 Pearlie Norton
 Ben Hall
 Harry Girard
 Hazel Evans

References

Bibliography
 Buck Rainey, Sweethearts of the sage: biographies and filmographies of 258 actresses appearing in western movies. McFarland, 1992.

External links
 

1922 films
1922 Western (genre) films
American black-and-white films
Films directed by George Edwardes-Hall
Silent American Western (genre) films
1920s English-language films
1920s American films